This is the results breakdown of the local elections held in Galicia on 3 April 1979. The following tables show detailed results in the autonomous community's most populous municipalities, sorted alphabetically.

Overall

City control
The following table lists party control in the most populous municipalities, including provincial capitals (shown in bold).

Municipalities

El Ferrol del Caudillo
Population: 88,161

La Coruña
Population: 224,289

Lugo
Population: 71,574

Orense
Population: 88,029

Pontevedra
Population: 63,863

Santiago de Compostela
Population: 81,536

Vigo
Population: 254,051

References

Galicia
1979